Al Wiley (c. 1928–11 April 1998) was a Canadian football player who played for the Winnipeg Blue Bombers. He previously played football at the University of Western Ontario.

References

1920s births
1998 deaths
Winnipeg Blue Bombers players
Place of birth missing